Vincent Descombes Sevoie (born 9 January 1984) is a French former ski jumper.

Career 

At the 2010 Winter Olympics in Vancouver, he finished ninth in the team large hill, 21st in the individual large hill, and 28th in the individual normal hill events. Sevoie's best finish at the FIS Nordic World Ski Championships was eighth in the team large hill event at Liberec in 2009. His best World Cup finish is fifth place in the individual large hill event at Ruka in November 2016. He is also a French national record holder.

World Cup

Standings

Individual starts (188)

References

External links 
 

1984 births
French male ski jumpers
Living people
Olympic ski jumpers of France
Ski jumpers at the 2010 Winter Olympics
Ski jumpers at the 2018 Winter Olympics
People from Chamonix
Sportspeople from Haute-Savoie